The Jazzpar Prize (established 1990) was an annual Danish jazz prize founded by trumpeter Arnvid Meyer. The winner was chosen from five nominees among internationally recognized performers. The winner received 200,000 Danish crowns and a bronze statue designed by Jørgen Haugen Sørensen. The ceremony was held in Copenhagen in the late spring, and began a week of jazz activities in the capital.  The main sponsor for many years was the Scandinavian Tobacco Company. The prize ended in 2005 due to loss of sponsorship. Arnvid Meyer died in 2007.

The candidates were selected by a panel of international critics including Filippo Bianchi (Italian editor of the magazine Musica Jazz and founder of the  Europe Jazz Network), Alex Dutilh (French editor of the magazine Jazzman), Peter H. Larsen (Danish journalist, editor, and radio producer), Dan Morgenstern (American jazz historian, author, and editor), Brian Priestley (British editor), and Boris Rabinowitsch (Danish jazz critic).

Prize winners
 1990 : Muhal Richard Abrams
 1991 : David Murray - The Jazzpar Prize
 1992 : Lee Konitz
 1993 : Tommy Flanagan - Flanagan's Shenanigans
 1994 : Roy Haynes
 1995 : Tony Coe
 1996 : Geri Allen - Some Aspects of Water
 1997 : Django Bates
 1998 : Jim Hall
 1999 : Martial Solal
 2000 : Chris Potter - This Will Be
 2001 : Marilyn Mazur
 2002 : Enrico Rava
 2003 : Andrew Hill - The Day the World Stood Still
 2004 : Aldo Romano

References

Jazz awards
Danish music awards
Danish jazz
Awards established in 1990